Statistics of the Football Tournament in the 1901/1902 season.

Overview
It was contested by 5 teams, and Boldklubben Frem won the championship.

League standings

References
Denmark - List of final tables (RSSSF)

1901–02 in Danish football
Top level Danish football league seasons
The Football Tournament seasons
Denmark